Lido Beach may refer to:
Lido Beach, Florida
Lido Beach, New York
Lido Beach (Hong Kong)
Lido Beach, Mogadishu